Penanti is a state constituency in Penang, Malaysia, that has been represented in the Penang State Legislative Assembly.

The state constituency was first contested in 1974 and is mandated to return a single Assemblyman to the Penang State Legislative Assembly under the first-past-the-post voting system. , the State Assemblywoman for Penanti is Norlela Ariffin from the Parti Keadilan Rakyat (PKR), which is part of the state's ruling coalition, Pakatan Harapan (PH).

Definition

Polling districts 
According to the federal gazette issued on 30 March 2018, the Penanti constituency is divided into 12 polling districts.

Demographics

History

Election results
The electoral results for the Penanti state constituency in 2008, 2009 by-election, 2013 and 2018 are as follows.

See also 
 Constituencies of Penang

References

Penang state constituencies